WorldView-3 (WV 3) is a commercial Earth observation satellite owned by DigitalGlobe. It was launched on 13 August 2014 to become DigitalGlobe's sixth satellite in orbit, joining Ikonos which was launched in 1999, QuickBird in 2001, WorldView-1 in 2007, GeoEye-1 in 2008, and WorldView-2 in 2009. WorldView-3 provides commercially available panchromatic imagery of  resolution, eight-band multispectral imagery with  resolution, shortwave infrared imagery at  resolution, and CAVIS (Clouds, Aerosols, Vapors, Ice, and Snow) data at  resolution.

Launch
WorldView-3 was launched on 13 August 2014 from Vandenberg Air Force Base on an Atlas V flying in the 401 configuration. The launch vehicle was provided by United Launch Alliance and launch services were administered by Lockheed Martin.

Notable uses 
Satellite images from WorldView-3 were used in 2015 by an international team of archaeologists to discover what they believe to be a Viking settlement on Point Rosee, Newfoundland.

From 2020, Scientists are using WorldView-3 to count and detect wildlife species, including African elephants. They used satellite imagery that required no ground presence to monitor the elephants. The team created a training dataset of 1,000 elephants and fed it to the Convolutional Neural Network (CNN) and compared the results to human performance.

See also

 2014 in spaceflight

References

External links
 WorldView-3 at DigitalGlobe.com

Commercial imaging satellites of the United States
Spacecraft launched in 2014
Spacecraft launched by Atlas rockets